Catchment Management Authority  may refer to:

 Catchment Management Authority (New South Wales)
 Catchment Management Authority (Victoria)